Andy Thompson (born 1970) is a Canadian actor, theatre artist, filmmaker and teacher.

Thompson was born and raised in Chilliwack, British Columbia. He received his theatre arts diploma in acting from Studio 58 in Vancouver, British Columbia, Canada in 1993. He is the founder of the multi-media theatre company The Virtual Stage.

As a theatre and film producer, director and writer, Thompson has won several awards. The Virtual Stage and Electric Company Theatre's 2008 production of No Exit, which Thompson co-produced and performed in, garnered rave reviews and won Jessie Richardson Theatre Awards for Outstanding Production as well as the Critics' Choice Innovation Award before touring across North America. He co-produced, co-wrote and performed in the short film The Provider, which won the 2010 Bloodshots 48-Hour Horror Filmmaking Competition before going to the 2011 Cannes Film Festival, where it was given a "Coup de Coeur" distinction as one of the best short films from Canada. Also in 2011, his entry into the international Film Racing Grand Prix short film competition, the super-hero spoof Repair Man, won 3rd place overall, and was the top-ranking Canadian film of the contest.

In 2013, Thompson's sci-fi musical comedy Broken Sex Doll was hailed in the press and described as the biggest hit of the Vancouver theatre season "and maybe the Next Big Thing in Canadian theatre." The show went on to garner seven Jessie Richardson Theatre Award nominations, including Outstanding Production and Outstanding Direction for Thompson.

Thompson is the creator of The Zombie Syndrome, an acclaimed annual, site-specific, interactive, theatrical event in Vancouver in which audience members with smartphones are endowed as elite agents on a mission to save the world from a deadly zombie plague. The event, produced by The Virtual Stage, began in 2012 under the original title The Zombie Syndrome. It went on to be nominated for two Jessie Richardson Theatre Awards: "Critics' Choice Innovation Award" and "Significant Artistic Achievement: Outstanding Logistical and Technical Innovation". In 2013, a sequel called The Zombie Syndrome: On Death Island took place on Granville Island and was praised by critics.

Early life
After graduating from high school with honours in physics and math, Thompson chose to study arts in college before committing to a career in engineering. This led to his decision to become an actor.

Filmography

Feature films

Television

Short films

Recognition
Jessie Award Nominations
Outstanding Performance by an Actor in a Leading Role: Small Theatre (1998/9) - Reading Hebron
Outstanding Performance by an Actor In a Supporting Role: Small Theatre (2002/3) - The Fall
Outstanding Original Play or Musical: Small Theatre (2002/3) - The Birth of Freedom
Sydney Risk Award for Outstanding original Script by an Emerging Playwright (2002/3) - The Birth of Freedom
Significant Artistic Achievements, Small Theatre, Outstanding Performance by an Ensemble (2006/7, with 12 other cast members) - The Shoes That Were Danced to Pieces
Significant Artistic Achievements, Small Theatre, Outstanding Technical Design (2006/7, with 6 other people) - Spank!
Significant Achievement Award, Small Theatre, Video Design & Editing (2008/9, with Bojan Bodruzic) - No Exit
Outstanding Direction: Small Theatre (2012/13) - Broken Sex Doll

Film Awards
Bloodshots 48-Hour Horror Filmmaking Contest (2010) Best Film, Best Costume Design & Cannes Short Film Corner (2011) Coup de Coeur distinction (co-producer, co-writer, actor) - The Provider
Vancouver Film Race (2010) Best Writing, Best Costume Design, Best Set Design, 4th Runner Up (co-writer, co-producer, director, editor) - Mayor Mulligan
International Film Racing Grand Prix (2011), 3rd Place Overall & top-ranking Canadian film (co-writer, director, producer) - Repair Man

Plays
 The Birth of Freedom (2002)
 SPANK! (2006)
 1984 (2011) (multi-media stage adaptation of Nineteen Eighty-Four by George Orwell)
 The Zombie Syndrome (2012)
 Broken Sex Doll (2013)
 The Zombie Syndrome: On Death Island (2013)

References

External links
 official website
 The Virtual Stage
 

1970 births
Living people
Canadian male dramatists and playwrights
Canadian male film actors
Canadian male stage actors
Canadian male television actors
Male actors from British Columbia
People from Chilliwack
Writers from British Columbia
20th-century Canadian dramatists and playwrights
20th-century Canadian male actors
20th-century Canadian male writers
21st-century Canadian dramatists and playwrights
21st-century Canadian male actors
21st-century Canadian male writers